, or  and  Kōreisai, are days of worship in Japan that began in 1878 to pay respects to the past emperors and imperial family members. It occurred on the spring and autumn equinoxes of the anniversary of the person's death. After the 1948 passing of the Act on National Holidays, these days were marked in a non-religious manner as the national holidays of Vernal Equinox Day and Autumnal Equinox Day. During the event, one prayed for good harvest in the spring and said thank you for the harvest in autumn.  The equinoxes were also the days of ancestor veneration in China.

See Also 
 Japanese Imperial Rituals

March observances
September observances
Public holidays in Japan
Japanese Imperial Rituals